Polgasowita is a town in Western Province, Sri Lanka.  It is located  a short distance south-east of central Colombo.

References

External links
 Polgasowita information from gomapper.com

Populated places in Western Province, Sri Lanka